Dollaseite-(Ce) is a sorosilicate end-member epidote rare-earth mineral which was discovered by Per Geijer (1927) in the Ostanmossa mine (Östanmossa gruva), Norberg district, Sweden. Dollaseite-(Ce), although not very well known, is part of a broad epidote group of minerals which are primarily silicates, the most abundant type of minerals on earth. Dollaseite-(Ce) forms as dark-brown subhedral crystals primarily in Swedish mines. With the ideal chemical formula, dollaseite-(Ce) can be partially identified by its content of the rare earth element cerium.

History 
The mineral provisionally named "magnesium orthite" by Geijer himself was renamed after structural refinement by Peacor and Dunn in 1988 led to its proper classification. The name dollaseite-(Ce) was chosen in honor of Wayne Dollase, who performed broad research on epidote minerals. The original confusion of the mineral's composition was because of a complex atomic composition where an exchange of cations leads to a form of dollaseite-(Ce) that at first glimpse resembles an Mg analogue of allanite, now known as dissakisite-(Ce). Enami and Zang, Meyer, Hanson and Pearce also reported minerals that resembled the composition of a Mg analogue of allanite but none had sufficient data, or exact composition to be declared as a Mg analogue of allanite. It was not until 1991 that Edward S. Grew established dissakisite as the actual Mg-dominant allanite mineral with formula .

Composition 

With a general formula for the epidote group of A2M3Si3O13H dollaseite-(Ce) received its formula of  based on data from electron microprobe analytical procedures. The results give the empirical formula (Ca.91 Ce.45 La.20 Nd.20 Pr.09 Sm.08 Gd.06)(Mg1.81 Fe.25)Al.97 Si3.0(OH)1.25 F.88 O10.99 from which the standard formula is then derived after applying Levinson’s rules for renaming REE minerals.

Structure 

The atomic structure of dollaseite-(Ce) can be somewhat complex at times due to the charge-coupled substitution involving both cations and anions: 
 +  =  + . The average epidote-group mineral’s structure has chains of edge-sharing octahedral such as Al3+, Fe3+, Mn3+.  The cavities that are formed by the octahedral chains that are occupied by A(1) and A(2) cations are occupied by Ca2+ and its REE, Ce3+. Like the rest of the members of the epidote group, the aluminium octahedra in dollaseite-(Ce) share edges, forming endless chains. Similar to the other epidote-group minerals, dollaseite-(Ce) is monoclinic and thus is part 
of the space group P21/m. Peacor and Dunn (1988) refined the lattice parameters of dollaseite-(Ce) and concluded that the parameters were a=8.934(18) Å, b=5.721(7) Å, c=10.176(22) Å.

Geologic occurrence 
Dollaseite-(Ce) can generally be found in mineralized dolomite-tremolite rocks in the form of dark brown and subhedral crystals. Dollaseite-(Ce) can occur in a number of locations, but the most prominent is at Östanmossa, Sweden. The type of dollaseite-(Ce) that can generally be found at this location tends to be iron-poor and occurs in tremolite skarn. The fact that dollaseite-(Ce) can be prominently found in Sweden comes as no surprise since Sweden has been known to host many REE epidote-group minerals such as dissakisite-(Ce) and allanite-(Ce). Another dollaseite-(Ce) specimen with composition slightly similar to that of dissakisite-(Ce) can be found in rock composed of fluorite and fluorian phlogopite.

See also 
List of minerals
List of minerals named after people

References 

Epidote group
Monoclinic minerals
Minerals in space group 11